Mount Airy is an unincorporated community located within West Amwell Township in Hunterdon County, New Jersey, United States.

History
A mill existed on the Alexauken Creek east of Mount Airy prior to the Revolution.  By 1881, Mount Airy had a school, store, church, wagon and blacksmith shop, grist-mill, and about 12 dwellings.  Prior to 1881 a hotel was located at the settlement.

References

West Amwell Township, New Jersey
Unincorporated communities in Hunterdon County, New Jersey
Unincorporated communities in New Jersey
National Register of Historic Places in Hunterdon County, New Jersey